Zhang Hanhui (born October 1963) is a Chinese politician and diplomat currently serving as the Chinese Ambassador to Russia. Previously he served as deputy minister of Foreign Affairs and Chinese Ambassador to Kazakhstan.

Biography
Zhang was born in Jianping County, Liaoning, in October 1963. He graduated from Shanghai International Studies University, where he majored in Russian language and literature.

After university, he was assigned to the Ministry of Foreign Affairs. In 1991 he was reassigned as an attaché and third secretary to the Chinese embassy in Kyrgyzstan. He returned to China in 1995 and assumed the position of third secretary at the Department of European-Central Asian Affairs under the Ministry of Foreign Affairs. In 2001 he became Counsellor of the Chinese Embassy in Ukraine, a position he held until 2003. He was deputy division chief and division chief of the Department of European-Central Asian Affairs under the Ministry of Foreign Affairs between 2004 and 2014. In 2014 he became Ambassador of China to Kazakhstan, and served until 2018. After a brief stint as assistant foreign minister, he was promoted to deputy minister of Foreign Affairs in charge of relations with European and Central Asian countries. On August 10, 2019, he replaced Li Hui as the Chinese Ambassador to Russia.

Personal life
Zhang is married and has a daughter.

References

1963 births
Living people
Chinese diplomats
Shanghai International Studies University alumni
People's Republic of China politicians from Liaoning
Chinese Communist Party politicians from Liaoning
Ambassadors of China to Kazakhstan
Ambassadors of China to Russia